Tobochares is a Neotropical genus of water scavenger beetles in the family Hydrophilidae represented by 24 described species known from the Guiana Shield Region.

Taxonomy 
The genus Tobochares belongs in the subfamily Acidocerinae. It was first described by Short and García in 2007. Since then, as more species are discovered in the seepages of the Guiana Shield Region, there have been two additional papers describing several additional species.

Description 
Small beetles (1.5–2.6 mm), yellowish brown, orange brown to dark brown in coloration; eyes entire to emarginate; maxillary palps from short and slender to very short and stout. The elytral punctation and sculpture is highly variable in this genus. There is also variation in the shape of the male genitalia and wing development. A complete diagnosis was presented by Girón and Short.

Habitat 
Most Tobochares are considered seepage specialists. One species (Tobochares fusus) has been also collected in rotten fruits away from water sources.

Species 

 Tobochares akoerio Girón and Short, 2021: Suriname
 Tobochares arawak Girón and Short, 2021:  Guyana
 Tobochares anthonyae Girón and Short, 2021: Venezuela
 Tobochares atures Girón and Short, 2021: Venezuela
 Tobochares benettii Girón and Short, 2021: Brazil (Amazonas) 
 Tobochares canaima Girón and Short, 2021: Venezuela
 Tobochares canaliculatus Kohlenberg and Short, 2017: Venezuela
 Tobochares canthus Kohlenberg and Short, 2017: Venezuela
 Tobochares communis Girón and Short, 2021: Brazil (Amapá, Roraima), Guyana, Suriname, Venezuela
 Tobochares emarginatus Kohlenberg and Short, 2017: Suriname
 Tobochares fusus Girón and Short, 2021: Brazil (Amapá), French Guiana
 Tobochares goias Girón and Short, 2021: Brazil (Goiás) 
 Tobochares kappel Girón and Short, 2021: Suriname
 Tobochares kasikasima Short, 2013: Suriname
 Tobochares kolokoe Girón and Short, 2021: Suriname
 Tobochares kusad Kohlenberg and Short, 2017: Brazil (Roraima), Guyana
 Tobochares luteomargo Girón and Short, 2021: Venezuela
 Tobochares microps Girón and Short, 2021: Suriname
 Tobochares pallidus Kohlenberg and Short, 2017: Venezuela
 Tobochares pemon Girón and Short, 2021: Venezuela
 Tobochares romanoae Kohlenberg and Short, 2017: Brazil (Roraima) 
 Tobochares sipaliwini Short and Kadosoe, 2011: Brazil (Roraima), Guyana, Suriname
 Tobochares striatus Short, 2013: Suriname
 Tobochares sulcatus Short and García, 2007: Venezuela

References 

Hydrophilidae
Insects of South America
Insects described in 2007